Robert Lewis Shayon (August 15, 1912 – June 28, 2008) was a writer and producer for WOR and for the CBS Radio in New York City. He was also a teacher at the Annenberg School for Communication and the University of Pennsylvania.

Biography
He was born in Brooklyn on August 15, 1912. His mother died in 1918 when he was 6, and his father, who was an insurance salesman, later married a woman who had her own children. By the late 1920s, he was homeless and sleeping on park benches. He took odd jobs in theaters and occasionally he read poetry on the radio. There he met the Australian opera singer Leah Frances Russell (1891–1983), who became his mentor and benefactor. She introduced him to her daughter, Sheila Russell, whom he later married. They were married for 47 years, until her death in 1983. Shayon died on June 28, 2008, in Frankfort, Kentucky.

Radio programs
Operation Crossroads (1946)
The Eagle's Brood (1947)

Books authored
Interaction: television public affairs programming at the community level (1960)
Open to criticism (1971)
The Crowd-catchers; Introducing Television (1973)
Odyssey in Prime Time (2001)

References

Other sources
Oral history interview with Shayon in the Columbia Center for Oral History Research collection

1912 births
2008 deaths
Hollywood blacklist
Deaths from pneumonia in Kentucky
Homeless people
Writers from Brooklyn
American radio producers
Annenberg School for Communication at the University of Pennsylvania faculty